KLOE (730 AM) is a radio station that serves western Kansas from the town of Goodland, Kansas. The station's format is described as sports. Severe weather is also covered.

The station carries an extensive schedule of high school football and basketball games as well as University of Kansas football, and basketball. Colorado Rockies baseball and Denver Broncos football are also aired.

KLOE is owned by Melia Communications, a local company.

References

External links
Official website

Sports radio stations in the United States
LOE
Radio stations established in 1948
1948 establishments in Kansas